The Eco-pacifist Greens (LVEP) is an ecologist political party in Spain, founded in 1988.

References

1988 establishments in Spain
Green political parties in Spain
Pacifist parties
Political parties established in 1988
Political parties in Spain